Herbert Elmer Lorraine Pickering  (29 March 1919 – 25 July 2009) was a New Zealand politician of the National Party, and was a cabinet minister.

Biography

Pickering was born in Havelock in 1919, the son of Charles Henry Pickering. He received his education from Marlborough College, Christchurch Teachers' College, and the University of Canterbury. During World War II, he was a flying instructor for the RNZAF. After the war, he worked for the New Zealand Broadcasting School. In 1941, Pickering married Margaret Priscilla McKenzie, the daughter of Donald Seaforth McKenzie; they were to have two sons and one daughter.

The Hurunui electorate was abolished in 1963, and Pickering successfully contested the Rangiora electorate instead, which he represented until his retirement due to ill-health in 1972.

In 1961 he was one of ten National MPs to vote with the Opposition and remove capital punishment for murder from the Crimes Bill that the Second National Government had introduced.

In 1969, he was appointed to the Executive Council by Keith Holyoake (unusually, he was not also a cabinet minister) and served until 1972. He was Minister of Education in the Second National Government under Jack Marshall, from 9 February to 8 December 1972.

In the 1993 Queen's Birthday Honours, Pickering was appointed a Companion of the Queen's Service Order for public services. Pickering died on 25 July 2009.

Notes

References

1919 births
2009 deaths
New Zealand National Party MPs
Members of the Cabinet of New Zealand
New Zealand education ministers
Members of the New Zealand House of Representatives
New Zealand MPs for South Island electorates
Unsuccessful candidates in the 1960 New Zealand general election
People educated at Marlborough Boys' College
University of Canterbury alumni
New Zealand military personnel of World War II
Royal New Zealand Air Force personnel
Companions of the Queen's Service Order
People from Havelock, New Zealand
New Zealand justices of the peace